The 159th Specialized School or officially Specialized School No. 159 including in depth English learning, Solomianka raion, Kyiv municipality  is an ordinary public school which provides compulsory and specialized education.

The focus is on gifted students.

References

External links
 http://school159.com.ua/

See also 

Kyiv Specialized School No. 98

Kyiv Secondary School No. 189

Educational institutions established in 1975
Schools in Kyiv